The men's 400 metres event at the 1970 British Commonwealth Games was held on 22–23 July 1970 at the Meadowbank Stadium in Edinburgh, Scotland. It was the first time that the metric distance was contested at the Games replacing the 440 yards event.

Medalists

Results

Heats
Held on 22 July 1970

Qualification: First 4 in each heat (Q) and the next 4 fastest (q) qualify for the quarterfinals.

Quarterfinals
Held on 22 July 1970

Qualification: First 4 in each heat (Q) qualify directly for the semifinals.

Semifinals
Held on 23 July 1970

Qualification: First 4 in each semifinal (Q) qualify directly for the final.

Final
Held on 23 July 1970

References

Heats & Quarterfinals results (p9)
Semifinals & Final results
Australian results

Athletics at the 1970 British Commonwealth Games
1970